Dennis Clifford (born February 29, 1992) is an American professional basketball player who plays the center position.

College career 
Clifford played college basketball for Boston College. He was named team captain after his sophomore year. As a senior, he posted 9.9 points per game and 7.3 rebounds per game. He missed a game in December 2015 due to an illness, thought to be linked to an e. coli outbreak at a Chipotle.

Professional career

Santa Cruz Warriors (2016–2017)
After going undrafted in the 2016 NBA Draft, Clifford joined the Santa Cruz Warriors of the NBA Development League. He posted 11.9 points on 59 percent shooting and 8.1 rebounds per contest. He was selected to play at the 2017 NBA G League All-Star Game. However, he had a stress fracture of the left fibula and missed every game for the Warriors after March 4.

Alba Berlin (2017–2019)
On July 24, 2017, Clifford was reported to have signed with Alba Berlin to a one-year deal. On July 19, 2018, Clifford was reported to have extended his contract with Alba Berlin for another season. Clifford injured his patellar tendon in September 2018.

Igokea (2019)
On July 22, 2019, Clifford was reported to have signed with KK Igokea. On November 12, 2019, Clifford was reported to have parted way with KK Igokea by mutual agreement.

Delaware Blue Coats (2020)
On February 22, 2020, the Delaware Blue Coats announced that they had acquired Clifford from the Austin Spurs in exchange for a 2nd-round draft pick in the 2020 NBA G League Draft.

Rasta Vechta (2020–2021)
On July 27, 2020, Rasta Vechta of the Basketball Bundesliga announced that they had signed with Clifford.

Benfica (2021–present)
On August 19, 2021, he has signed with Benfica of the Liga Portuguesa de Basquetebol.

References

External links
 
 Profile at club website
 Boston College Eagles bio

1992 births
Living people
Alba Berlin players
ABA League players
American expatriate basketball people in Bosnia and Herzegovina
American expatriate basketball people in Germany
American men's basketball players
Basketball players from Massachusetts
Boston College Eagles men's basketball players
Centers (basketball)
KK Igokea players
Milton Academy alumni
People from Bridgewater, Massachusetts
Santa Cruz Warriors players
SC Rasta Vechta players
S.L. Benfica basketball players
Sportspeople from Plymouth County, Massachusetts